The 2013 Danish Figure Skating Championships was held in Aalborg from December 7 through 9, 2012. Skaters competed in the disciplines of men's singles, ladies' singles, and ice dancing on the levels of senior, junior, novice, and the pre-novice levels of debs, springs, and cubs. The results were used to choose the teams to the 2013 World Championships, the 2013 European Championships, the 2013 Nordic Championships, and the 2013 World Junior Championships.

Results

Men

Ladies

External links
 2013 Danish Championships results
 Dansk Skøjte Union

2013
2012 in figure skating
2013 in figure skating
Figure Skating Championships,2013